Mario Zanin (born 3 July 1940) is a former Italian cyclist who won a gold medal at the 1964 Olympics in the individual road race. After that he turned professional and in 1966 won one stage of the Vuelta a España. He retired in 1968.

References

External links

1940 births
Living people
Italian male cyclists
Cyclists at the 1964 Summer Olympics
Olympic gold medalists for Italy
Olympic cyclists of Italy
Cyclists from the Province of Treviso
Olympic medalists in cycling
Medalists at the 1964 Summer Olympics